View of Luxembourg from the Fetschenhof is a painting by Nicolas Liez, from 1870.

Analysis
The painting show the dismantling of the fortress after the Treaty of London of 1867.
It shows a luminosity and scale of German Romanticism.

References

Romantic paintings
Romanticism